Harald Jannach (born 27 May 1972) is an Austrian politician who has been a Member of the National Council for the Freedom Party of Austria (FPÖ) since 2008.

References

1972 births
Living people
Members of the National Council (Austria)
Freedom Party of Austria politicians